Pierre-Félix Lagrange (22 January 1857 – 22 April 1928) was a French ophthalmologist.

Early life
Pierre-Félix Lagrange was born on January 22, 1857, in Soumensac, département lot-et-Garonne, France. He studied medicine at the University of Bordeaux in Bordeaux.

Career
Lagrange was a professor with the faculty of medicine at Bordeaux. He was a specialist in the study and treatment of ophthalmic disorders, including eye tumors, strabismus, refraction anomalies and glaucoma. He is remembered for introducing a surgical technique that was a combination of an iridectomy and sclerectomy for treatment of glaucoma. This surgery was later referred to as a "sclerectoiridectomy" or "Lagrange's operation".

With Emile Valude (1857–1930), Lagrange was co-publisher of the Encyclopédie française d'ophtalmologie (1903–10).

Death
He died on April 22, 1928. He was seventy-one years old.

Selected writings 
 Etudes sur les tumeurs de l'oeil, de l'orbite et des annexes. Paris, G. Steinheil, 1893.
 Rapport sur le diagnostic et le traitement des tumeurs de l'orbite. Paris, 1903.
 Atlas d'ophtalmoscopie de guerre. 1918

References 
 This article incorporates translated text from an equivalent article at the French Wikipedia.
 Pierre-Félix Lagrange @ Who Named It

1857 births
1928 deaths
French ophthalmologists
Academic staff of the University of Bordeaux
People from Lot-et-Garonne